You Shoot, I Shoot (買兇拍人) is a 2001 Hong Kong black comedy film produced, written and directed by Pang Ho-cheung and starring Eric Kot and Cheung Tat-ming.

Plot
Bart (Eric Kot), a professional contract killer, is requested by his clients to film his killings. He hires aspiring film director Lee Tung-chuen (Cheung Tat-ming) for the filming.

Cast and roles
 Eric Kot as Bart
 Cheung Tat-ming as Lee Tung-chuen
 Chan Fai-hung as Hung
 Michael Chan as Bill
 Jim Chim as Double Gun Tai Hung / Kwok Wai-bun
 Audrey Fang as Ling, Bart's wife 
 Miu Fei-lam as Mrs. Ma
 Asuka Higuchi as Michiko
 Vincent Kok as Camera / X-rated VCD shop owner
 Ken Wong as Ray
 Nancy Lan as Mrs. Nina Nam
 Lam Suet as Fatty
 Tats Lau as James
 Spencer Lam - Mr. Tse
 Hyper BB as Mahjong girl at restaurant
 Frankie Ng as Brother B
 Angela Tong as Mrs. Tong
 Matt Chow as Porno director
 Henry Fong as Foul-mouthed Wah
 Yu Ming-hin as Bart's first victim
 Chan Yun-ping as Boutique staff
 Pang Sau-wai as Girl massaging porno director
 Eric Chan as Jackie
 Poon An-ying as Tea lady on porno set
 Anthony Ng as Bill's thug at restaurant
 Tin Kai-man as Junkie Derek
 Wong Man-chung as Traffic policeman
 Joe Cheng as Mrs. Ma's mahjong friend
 Henry Yu as Mr. Tai
 Siu Yam-yam as Mrs. Tai
 Billy Chung as Bart's MTV victim
 Andy Tsang as Bart's MTV victim
 Wilson Yip as Bart's MTV victim
 Lam Chiu-wing as Bart's MTV victim
 James Tse as Bart's MTV victim
 Wenders Li as Bart's MTV victim
 Roy Szeto as Bart's MTV victim
 Peter Kam as Bart's MTV victim
 Wu Ka-lok as Bart's MTV victim
 Kenneth Bi as Bart's MTV victim
 Clarence Cheung as Bart's MTV victim
 Ho Chi-moon as Mr. Cheung
 Lee To-yue as Brother Chun
 Berg Ng as Curry Samosa
 Chiu Wan-kit as Brother B's thug
 Ricky Fan as Brother B's thug
 Christy Cheung as Wing
 So Wai-nam as Horny muscle man at Bill's office
 Chow Siu-lun as Doggie
 Siu Hung as Restaurant worker
 Terence Tsui as Bill's bare body thug
 Luk Kwong-choi as Old man
 Roderick Lam as Policeman
 Lee Shiu-cheung as Policeman
 Chan Kin-yung as Policeman
 Wai Ping-chung as Policeman
 Pang Ho-cheung as Director
 Tam Kon-chung as Brother B's thug
 Pierre Tremblay as voice of Alain Delon (uncredited)

Accolades

External links
 
 HK cinemagic entry

2001 films
2001 black comedy films
Hong Kong black comedy films
Hong Kong slapstick comedy films
2000s Cantonese-language films
Golden Harvest films
Films directed by Pang Ho-cheung
Films about film directors and producers
Films about contract killing
Films set in Hong Kong
Films shot in Hong Kong
2001 comedy films
2000s Hong Kong films